Kolana ergina is a butterfly in the family Lycaenidae. It is found in Brazil (Amazonas) and French Guiana.

References

Eumaeini
Lycaenidae of South America
Lepidoptera of Brazil
Lepidoptera of French Guiana
Fauna of the Amazon
Butterflies described in 1867
Taxa named by William Chapman Hewitson